Turbonilla macaensis is a species of sea snail, a marine gastropod mollusk in the family Pyramidellidae, the pyrams and their allies.

Description
The shell grows to a length of 8 mm.

Distribution
This species occurs in the Atlantic Ocean off Brazil, Uruguay and Argentina at depths between 30 m and 65 m.

References

External links
 To Encyclopedia of Life
 To USNM Invertebrate Zoology Mollusca Collection
 To World Register of Marine Species

macaensis
Gastropods described in 2001